A List of tours, concerts and festivals held by Lebanese singer Layal Abboud.
Abboud abstains from performing during Islamic month of Ramadan. After the end of Ramadan, on the occasion of Eid al-Fitr, she restart her concert managing.

Tours and concerts

Other notable appearances

References 

Lists of concert tours